Gandhara is a genus of moths in the subfamily Arctiinae. The genus was erected by Frederic Moore in 1878.

Most species were previously placed in the genus Eilema.

Species
 Gandhara serva (Walker, 1854)
 Gandhara vietnamica Dubatolov, 2012

References

Lithosiina
Moth genera